Strömmensberg is a district in Gothenburg, Sweden, which belongs to Örgryte. It is a part of the officially defined residential district Bagaregården.

Gothenburg